The Beaver County Courthouse in Beaver in Beaver County, Oklahoma was built in 1926.  Located off U.S. Route 270, it is a red brick  two-story courthouse built around old 1907 stone courthouse.

It was listed on the National Register of Historic Places in 1984.

References

National Register of Historic Places in Beaver County, Oklahoma
Government buildings completed in 1926
Beaver County, Oklahoma